Marripudi is an Indian village in Bapatla district of the Indian state of Andhra Pradesh.

It is located 41 km towards South from Guntur. 11 km from District headquarters Bapatla.

Poondla ( 1 km ), Appikatla ( 2 km ), Gudipudi ( 2 km ), Bharthipudi ( 3 km ), Gopapuram ( 3 km ) are the nearby Villages to Marripudi.

Marripudi is surrounded by Bapatla Mandal towards South, Pittalavanipalem Mandal towards East, Kakumanu Mandal towards west, Ponnur Mandal towards North . Bapatla, Ponnur, Chirala, Tenali are the nearby Cities to Marripudi..

how to reach Marripudi 
By Rail Appikatla Railway Station, Machavaram Rail Way Station are the very nearby railway stations to Marripudi. How ever Guntur Jn Rail Way Station is major railway station 39 km near to Marripudi

By Bus Ponnur APSRTC Bus Station, Bapatla APSRTC Bus Station are the nearby Bus Stations to Marripudi.

References

Villages in Guntur district